Spinyfins are a family, Diretmidae, of trachichthyform fishes. The family name is derived from the type genus, Diretmus, from Greek, di meaning "two" and eretmos meaning "oar".

As the common name implies, spinyfins have heavy spines along their fins. They have deep, compressed bodies, and almost vertically aligned mouths.

See also
List of fish families

References

Diretmidae
Taxa described in 1896
Taxa named by Theodore Gill